Sarbisheh is a city in South Khorasan Province, Iran.

Sarbisheh or Sar Bisheh may also refer to:
 Sar Bisheh, Chaharmahal and Bakhtiari
 Sar Bisheh, Fars
 Sarbisheh, Ilam
 Sar Bisheh, Isfahan
 Sar Bisheh, Dezful, Khuzestan Province
 Sar Bisheh, Kohgiluyeh and Boyer-Ahmad
 Sar Bisheh-ye Olya, Kohgiluyeh and Boyer-Ahmad Province
 Sar Bisheh-ye Sofla, Kohgiluyeh and Boyer-Ahmad Province
 Sar Bisheh, Lorestan
 Sarbisheh County, in South Khorasan Province

See also
 Bisheh Sar, Mazandaran Province